The R522 road is a regional road in Ireland which runs 51 kilometres from Newcastlewest in County Limerick to the N73 national secondary road near Doneraile in County Cork, passing through Dromcolliher and Buttevant.

See also
Roads in Ireland
National primary road
National secondary road

References
Roads Act 1993 (Classification of Regional Roads) Order 2006 – Department of Transport

Regional roads in the Republic of Ireland
Roads in County Limerick
Roads in County Cork